The Worcester Busters was an American baseball team which played at Boulevard Park, Worcester, Massachusetts.  They played in Class B of the New England League from 1906 and the Eastern League from 1916 to 1921.

References

1906 establishments in Massachusetts
1921 disestablishments in Massachusetts
Busters
Defunct baseball teams in Massachusetts
New England League teams
Baseball teams established in 1906
Baseball teams disestablished in 1921